Patos is a municipality in Brazil.

Patos, Los Patos may also refer to:

 Patos, Albania, a town
 Los Patos, Barahona, Dominican Republic, a small town
 Los Patos, a mountain in the Andes between Argentina and Chile
 Paso de Los Patos, a mountain pass in the Andes between Argentina and Chile
 Dos Patos River (disambiguation)
 Río de los Patos, Argentina, a river
 Lagoa dos Patos, Brazil, a lagoon
 Canal dos Patos (Macau), a short canal
 Patos Island, Washington, United States
 Patos Island (Venezuela)
 Roman Catholic Diocese of Patos, Brazil

See also
 Pato (disambiguation)